Sven Lennart Jacobsson (17 April 1914 – 9 July 1983) was a Swedish football midfielder who played for GAIS. He also represented Team Sweden in the 1938 FIFA World Cup in France.

References

External links

1914 births
1983 deaths
Swedish footballers
Sweden international footballers
Association football midfielders
Allsvenskan players
GAIS players
1938 FIFA World Cup players
Footballers from Gothenburg